Jaraka is a town in Dharmasala Block of Jajpur district in Odisha, India and is located on the banks of Brahmani River. It is one of the fastest-growing areas in the district.

Geography 

It is located on the banks of River Brahmani and is divided into two parts by National Highway 16 (India).

The Western part mainly consists of Bada Bazaar, Hanuman Market, College Road, Telephone Exchange Road, Stadium Road, IDCO Industrial Estate and several Residential areas. There are a number of colonies here, the major ones are Kumari Colony, SuryaVihar Colony (Jamubania) and Pandua. It also has the Block Headquarters Office, Treasury and several Govt. Offices.

The Eastern Part consists of mainly Market areas namely Main Market, Bus Stand, Cuttack Road, Gopabandhu Chhak and Shanti Baazar.

To the north of the town Deuli Hill is present on the banks of Bramhani River

Population 

The Population of the town is around 10,000.

Education

Literacy 

The town has a literacy rate of 87.28%, Males having 92.04% and females having 81.74%.

Educational Institutions 
The town has several Schools and Colleges namely :-

•Jaraka High School

•Jaraka UP School

•Jaraka Primary School

•Dharmasala Mahavidyalaya

•Dharmasala Public School

•Venkateswar School

•Vivekananda Shiksha Kendra

•Vivekananda Shiksha Niketan

•Renaissance Higher Secondary School

•Gokarnika Higher Secondary School

•Dharmasala Women's College

Tourist Attractions

Gokarneswar Temple 
Gokarneswar Temple is a famous temple dedicated to Lord Shiva which is present on the banks of river Bramhani Adjacent to NH-16 and Bramhani Bridge.
On the top of Deuli Hill, there is a Buddhist site and a sunset view spot.

Pushpagiri Vihara (Langudi Hill) 
Langudi Hill is another well known Buddhist Site famous for its monastic complex called Pushpagiri Vihara. These sites contain ruins of many buildings, stupas of various sizes, sculptures and many other artefacts related to Buddhism.

Deuli Hill and view point 
The Deuli hill was discovered as an archeological point of ancient Buddhist remains and thrives as a tourist attraction these days. A new view point tower has been built recently to enjoy the breathtaking views of the town and the banking river Bramhani.

Industry 
The town also has many small and medium scale industries at IDCO Industrial Estate. The only Large Scale industrial facility present in the area is Ramco Cement Manufacturing Plant located at Haridaspur.

Notable People 
Kalpataru Das
Tushar Parida
Pranab Balabantaray
Debi Prasanna Dash
 Satish Kumar Jena

References

External Links 

Jajpur district